Habrophlebiodes is a genus of mayflies in the family Leptophlebiidae.

References

Mayflies
Mayfly genera
Insects of Europe